Nettelbeck is a surname. Notable people with this surname include:
Craig Nettelbeck, Australian footballer
F. A. Nettelbeck, American poet
Paul Nettelbeck, German long-distance runner
Sandra Nettelbeck, German film director
Ted Nettelbeck, Australian psychologist
Uwe Nettelbeck, German record producer and journalist